Mrisho Khalfani juma Ngasa (born 5 May 1989) is a Tanzanian professional footballer who plays for Tanzanian Championship League club Ndanda. He is the Tanzania national team most-capped player and top goalscorer.

Club career
In April 2009, Ngasa was invited for a trial with English Premier League side West Ham United. On 21 May 2010, Ngassa joined Azam FC for $40,000 from Young Africans. It was the biggest transfer in Tanzanian football to date. In July 2011, Ngassa went on trial with Seattle Sounders FC of Major League Soccer, and came on as a substitute against Manchester United in a friendly match.

At the beginning of August 2012, Ngasa signed for Simba, on loan.

Following the 2012–13 Tanzanian Premier League season, after his contract with Azam FC had expired, on 20 May 2013 Ngassa signed a two-year contract with the league and cup title holders Young Africans.

In 2015, Ngasa signed a four-year contract with Free State Stars, a South African-based club. He then signed for Fanja in Oman. In 2016 Ngasa signed a two-year contract with Mbeya City in Tanzania. Ngasa then joined Ndanda, also in Tanzania.

International career
Ngasa was the top scorer in the 2009 CECAFA Cup with five goals as Tanzania finished fourth in the tournament. He is one of the top scorers of 2014 CAF champions league with two hat tricks making a totality of six goals.

Ngasa played 100 games between 2006 and 2015, scoring 25 goals in the process. He is the Tanzania national team's most-capped player and all-time top goalscorer.

Personal life
Ngasa is the son of Khalfan Ngasa, a former Tanzanian international footballer who played as a midfielder. Ngassa is among of  talented players in Tanzania who impressed many coaches and scouts around the world, among of famous coaches who was impressed by his talent was Gianfranco Zola, the former Chelsea and Italian national team player, who was working as the manager of West Ham United F.C.

Career statistics

International
Scores and results list Tanzania's goal tally first.

Honours
Young Africans
Tanzanian Premier League: 2007–08, 2008–09, 2009–10, 2010–11, 2011–12, 2012–13, 2013–14
Tusker Cup: 2007, 2009

Azam
Kagame Interclub Cup runner-up: 2012
Individual
Tanzanian Premier League Best Player: 2009–10
Tanzania Premier League Golden Boot: 2010–11
CECAFA Cup Golden Boot: 2009  
 Africa Champions league Golden Boot: 2013–14
 VPL Best Player of the Month: April 2015

See also
 List of men's footballers with 100 or more international caps

References

External links
 
 

1989 births
Living people
People from Dar es Salaam
Tanzanian footballers
Tanzania international footballers
Association football forwards
Association football wingers
Young Africans S.C. players
Simba S.C. players
Free State Stars F.C. players
Azam F.C. players
FIFA Century Club
Tanzanian Premier League players
Tanzania A' international footballers
2009 African Nations Championship players
Expatriate soccer players in South Africa
Tanzanian expatriate sportspeople in South Africa
Tanzanian expatriate sportspeople in Oman
Tanzanian expatriate footballers
Expatriate footballers in Oman